Coleman Barks (born April 23, 1937) is an American poet, and former literature faculty at the University of Georgia. Although he neither speaks nor reads Persian, he is a popular interpreter of Rumi, rewriting the poems based on other English translations.

Early life and education
Barks is a native of Chattanooga, Tennessee. He attended the Baylor School as a teenager, then studied collegiately at the University of North Carolina and the University of California, Berkeley.

Barks was a student of the Sufi Shaykh Bawa Muhaiyaddeen.

Career
Barks taught literature at the University of Georgia for three decades.

Barks makes frequent international appearances and is well known throughout the Middle East. Barks' work has contributed to an extremely strong following of Rumi in the English-speaking world. Due to his work, the ideas of Sufism have crossed many cultural boundaries over the past few decades. Barks received an honorary doctorate from University of Tehran in 2006.

He has also read his original poetry at the Geraldine R. Dodge Poetry Festival. In March 2009, Barks was inducted to the Georgia Writers' Hall of Fame.

Rumi interpretations
Barks has published several volumes of his interpretations of Rumi's poetry since 1976, including The Hand of Poetry, Five Mystic Poets of Persia in 1993, The Essential Rumi in 1995, The Book of Love in 2003 and A Year with Rumi in 2006.

Original poetry
Barks has published several volumes of his own poetry, including Gourd Seed, "Quickly Aging Here", Tentmaking, and, in 2001, Granddaughter Poems, a collection of Coleman's poetry about his granddaughter, Briny Barks, with illustrations by Briny. Harper published his first book of poetry, The Juice, in 1972.

Discography

Other credits

See also

 Persian poetry
 Sufism

References

Further reading
  Audio interview with Coleman Barks and Andrew Harvey, by Mary Hynes of Tapestry.

External links 
 
 Four new translations of Rumi by Barks

1937 births
Living people
American Sufis
American male poets
American spoken word poets
American translators
Iranologists
People from Chattanooga, Tennessee
Poets from Tennessee
Sufi poets
University of California, Berkeley alumni
University of Georgia faculty
University of North Carolina at Chapel Hill alumni